Barry Leslie is a former Australian rules footballer who played for the Collingwood Football Club and North Melbourne Football Club in the Victorian Football League (VFL).

Notes

External links 

1946 births
Australian rules footballers from Victoria (Australia)
Collingwood Football Club players
North Melbourne Football Club players
South Bendigo Football Club players
Living people